Giovanni Soranzo (born Burano, 1240 - died Venice, 31 December 1328) was a Venetian statesman of the prominent Soranzo family who served as the 51st Doge of Venice. He ascended to the position on 13 July 1312 and served until his death. Soranzo was a member of a noble family; he was married to Franchesina. In 1310 his son-in-law, Niccolo' Querini was exiled for life from Venice for taking part in Bajamonte Tiepolo's conspiracy to overthrow the state.  Soranzo was succeeded as Doge by Francesco Dandolo.

References

1240 births
1328 deaths
14th-century Doges of Venice